Penelope Skinner is a British playwright. She came to prominence after her play Fucked was first produced in 2008 at the Old Red Lion Theatre and the Edinburgh Festival to huge critical acclaim and has had successive plays staged in London including at the Bush Theatre, National Theatre and Royal Court Theatre, where she is a member of the Young Writers Programme.

Her play Eigengrau staged at the Bush Theatre in 2010 was a critical and box office hit and Skinner was nominated for the Evening Standard Award for Most Promising Playwright in 2010.

Skinner's play The Village Bike was her first play to be staged at the Royal Court Theatre where it had a sell out, twice-extended run starring Romola Garai and directed by Joe Hill-Gibbins, winning her the George Devine Award and the Evening Standard Award for Most Promising Playwright in 2011.

In 2011, she wrote episodes for the Channel 4 series Fresh Meat.  In 2011, her play The Sound of Heavy Rain was produced by Paines Plough and Sheffield Theatres touring in Roundabout.

Her play Fred's Diner was staged at the Chichester Festival Theatre's pop-up stage, following which The Independent newspaper described Skinner as "Our leading young feminist writer."

In 2013, Skinner co-wrote the screenplay for the film How I Live Now.

Work
2018 Meek premiered at Traverse Theatre directed by Amy Hodge
2017 Linda Manhattan Theatre Club, New York; directed by Lynne Meadow
2015 Linda Royal Court Theatre
2015 The Ruins of Civilization premiered at Manhattan Theatre Club directed by Leah C. Gardiner
2012 Fred's Diner premiered at Chichester Festival Theatre directed by Tim Hoare
2011 The Sound of Heavy Rain premiered as part of Paines Plough's Roundabout Season directed by James Grieve
2011 The Village Bike premiered at the Royal Court Theatre directed by Joe Hill-Gibbins
2011 Greenland co-written with Moira Buffini, Matt Charman and Jack Thorne premiered at the National Theatre directed by Bijan Sheibani
2010 Come To Where I'm From Season a short play commissioned by Paines Plough premiered at the Oxford Playhouse
2010 Don't Look Back premiered at the Young Vic directed by Natalie Ibu
2010 Eigengrau premiered at the Bush Theatre directed by Polly Findlay
2008 Fucked premiered at the Old Red Lion Theatre directed by Daniel Goldman then went to the Edinburgh Festival in 2009

References

Living people
English dramatists and playwrights
British women dramatists and playwrights
Year of birth missing (living people)
21st-century British dramatists and playwrights
21st-century English women writers
British women screenwriters
21st-century British screenwriters